The D'Iberville class was a group of torpedo cruisers built for the French Navy in the 1890s.

Design
In the early 1880s, the French Navy began building a series of torpedo cruisers to make use of the new, self-propelled Whitehead torpedo. The three vessels of the D'Iberville class marked a return to larger vessels, with greatly increased speed compared to their predecessors. The design for the first vessel was prepared by the  shipyard as part of a design competition requested by Édouard Barbey, the Minister of the Marine. All of these ships have been alternatively called torpedo cruisers, torpedo gunboats, or torpedo avisos.

Characteristics

D'Iberville displaced , while Cassini and Casabianca were slightly heavier, displacing . The ships had a raised forecastle and quarterdeck, and as was typical for French warships of the period, they featured a pronounced ram bow. They were fitted with a pair of pole masts. Their crew varied from 140 to 143 officers and enlisted men over the course of their careers. The ships rolled very badly in heavy seas.

The first two ships' propulsion system consisted of a pair of quadruple-expansion steam engines driving two screw propellers, while Casabianca had two triple-expansion steam engines. Steam was provided by eight coal-burning water-tube boilers that were ducted into two funnels. The ships were, at the time of their completion, the fastest torpedo cruisers in the world.

The ships were armed with a main battery of one  gun in a pivot mount forward. For close-range defense against torpedo boats, they carried three 9-pounder quick-firing guns and six or seven  3-pounder Hotchkiss guns, all in individual mounts. The 9-pounders were placed further aft, one on each broadside and the third on the stern. D'Iberville was also armed with six  torpedo tubes, while Cassini and Casabianca only received three; all of the vessels carried them in their hulls above the waterline.

Cassini and Casabianca had a deck that was uniformly 20 mm thick, including the sloped sides. All three ships had 40 mm plating on the conning tower.

Modifications

D'Iberville had her torpedo tubes removed in 1896, and had additional Hotchkiss guns installed in their place. Cassini and Casabianca had one of their tubes removed by 1899.

Cassini and Casabianca were converted into minelayers in 1913, with a capacity of 97 naval mines.

Construction

Service history

Notes

References
 
 
 
 
 
 
 

 
Ship classes of the French Navy